Erik Henry Sixten Nilsson (6 August 1916 – 9 September 1995) was a Swedish footballer who played as a left back. Nilsson played his youth days with Limhamns IF, before he moved in 1934 to Allsvenskan club Malmö FF, where he played until 1953. There he won five league titles and five Swedish Cups. During his playing days he rejected an offer from A.C. Milan.

Career
Nilsson played 57 times for the Sweden national football team, and participated in several international tournaments. He played in the 1938 FIFA World Cup, where Sweden finished fourth. He took part in the 1948 London Olympics, where Sweden celebrated its best international result with a gold medal, defeating Yugoslavia 3–1 in the final. Two years later he competed in the 1950 FIFA World Cup where Sweden finished third, thus becoming one of only two players to play in World Cups before and after World War II (the other being Switzerland's Alfred Bickel). In the 1950 World Cup, Nilsson was also elected into the All-Star team of the tournament. He won another medal in the 1952 Helsinki Olympics, where Sweden won the bronze after defeating Germany 2–0.

In 1950, Nilsson was awarded the Guldbollen as the year's best Swedish football player. In 2003, he was inducted into the SFS Hall Of Fame.

Honours
Malmö FF
Swedish Champions: 1943–44, 1948–49, 1949–50, 1950–51, 1952–53
Division 2 Södra: 1934–35, 1935–36
Svenska Cupen: 1944, 1946, 1947, 1951, 1953
Sweden
1948 Summer Olympics: gold medal winner
1952 Summer Olympics: bronze medal third place
1950 FIFA World Cup: third place
1938 FIFA World Cup: fourth place
Individual
FIFA World Cup All-Star Team: 1950
Guldbollen: 1950
SFS Hall Of Fame: 2003

References

External links

1916 births
1995 deaths
Swedish footballers
Footballers from Skåne County
Sweden international footballers
Allsvenskan players
IF Limhamn Bunkeflo (men) players
Malmö FF players
1938 FIFA World Cup players
1950 FIFA World Cup players
Olympic footballers of Sweden
Footballers at the 1948 Summer Olympics
Footballers at the 1952 Summer Olympics
Olympic gold medalists for Sweden
Olympic bronze medalists for Sweden
Olympic medalists in football
Medalists at the 1952 Summer Olympics
Medalists at the 1948 Summer Olympics
Association football fullbacks